Sykhiv District is urban district of Lviv, named after the historical district of Sykhiv. This district covers southeastern part of the city.

Sykhiv District was officially created in 2000 which makes it the newest district of Lviv. It contains such neighborhoods as Novyi Lviv, Persenkivka, Kozelnyky and actually Sykhiv. Northern part of the district was developed mostly during the 1920s and 1930s when Lviv belonged to Poland. Southeastern (the core of the raion) and western parts were developed in the 1980s and 1990s by Ukrainian Soviet government.

In June 2001 Pope John Paul II during his visit to Lviv carried out two meetings here.

In Sykhiv District are situated Arena Lviv stadium and Lviv Bus Factory.

See also
Subdivisions of Ukraine

Urban districts of Lviv